The 1952 United States Senate election in Minnesota took place on November 4, 1952. Incumbent Republican Edward John Thye defeated Democratic challenger Bill Carlson to win a second term.

Democratic–Farmer–Labor primary

Candidates

Declared
 William E. (Bill) Carlson
 John A. McDonough
 F. H. Shoemaker

Results

Republican primary

Candidates

Declared
 John M. Arneson
 A. B. Gilbert
 Arthur D. Russell
 Edward C. Slettedahl
 Edward J. Thye, Incumbent U.S. Senator since 1947

Results

General election

Results

See also 
 United States Senate elections, 1952

References

Minnesota
1952
1952 Minnesota elections